Whoop Dee Doo may refer to:

 Whoop Dee Doo, a polka
 Whoop Dee Doo, a variety show
 Whoop-Dee-Doo!, a musical revue, 1993-1994
 Whoop-Dee-Doo, a 1904 Broadway musical
 Whoop Dee Doo, an album by The Muffs
 A hand gesture
 A mixed drink
 A BMX mogul